Dolichoderus thoracicus is a species of ant in the genus Dolichoderus. Described by Smith in 1860, the species is widespread in Asia.

References

Dolichoderus
Hymenoptera of Asia
Insects described in 1860